Uttambhai Harjibhai  Patel (25 July 1927 – 30 January 2018) was an Indian politician. He was a member of the Lok Sabha for the Valsad constituency in Gujarat as a candidate of the Indian National Congress. He was the Union Minister of State, Rural Development. He was earlier a member of the Gujarat Legislative Assembly

References

External links
Official biographical sketch in Parliament of India website

India MPs 1980–1984
India MPs 1984–1989
India MPs 1991–1996
1927 births
2018 deaths
People from Valsad district
Lok Sabha members from Gujarat
Indian National Congress politicians
Bombay State MLAs 1957–1960
Gujarat MLAs 1960–1962
Gujarat MLAs 1962–1967
Gujarat MLAs 1967–1971
Gujarat MLAs 1972–1974
Gujarat MLAs 1975–1980
Indian National Congress politicians from Gujarat